Leptophobia olympia, the Olympia white, is a butterfly in the family Pieridae. It is found in Peru, Ecuador, Venezuela and Colombia.

Subspecies
The following subspecies are recognised:
Leptophobia olympia olympia (Ecuador, Venezuela, Colombia)
Leptophobia olympia potoniei Baumann & Reissinger, 1969 (Peru)

References

Pierini
Butterflies described in 1861
Pieridae of South America
Taxa named by Baron Cajetan von Felder
Taxa named by Rudolf Felder